The  History of motorcycle speedway in Sweden consists of the league tables of motorcycle speedway in Sweden.

History 
The first season was in 1948 but it was during the 1950s motorcycle speedway became one of Sweden's most popular team sports where each fixture drew audiences between 10,000 and 20,000 people.

The Swedish Speedway Team Championship was founded a few years earlier in 1948 and was inspired by British speedway including adopting the British teams nicknames in Swedish versions. For instance the Norrköping team became Vargarna (English: "The Wolves"), the Eskilstuna team became Smederna (English: "The Blacksmiths") and the club Motorsällskapet became Getingarna (English: "The Wasps"). As popularity of the sport grew there were many new clubs founded all around Sweden and during the 1950s more than 30 different clubs competed at least one season in the league system. Some of these teams were short lived and only survived a few years but some continue to compete in the Elitserien and Allsvenskan today.

List of league champions

List of individual champions

1940s 

1948

1949

1950s 

1950

1951

1952

1953

1954

1955

1956

1957

1958

1959

1960s 

1960

1961

1962

1963

1964

1965

1966

1967

1968

1969

1970s 

1970

1971

1972

1973

1974

1975

1976

1977

1978

1979

1980s 

1980

1981

1982

Top division renamed the Elitserien.

1983

1983 Swedish Individual Speedway Championship (Mariestad, 10 September)

1983 Swedish Speedway Team Championship

1984

1984 Swedish Individual Speedway Championship (Karlstad, 8 September)

1984 Swedish Speedway Team Championship

The Smederna club split up in two separate clubs called Smederna and Tuna Rebels.

1985

1985 Swedish Individual Speedway Championship (Målilla, 7 September)

1985 Swedish Speedway Team Championship

1986

1986 Swedish Individual Speedway Championship (Norrkoping, 6 September)

1986 Swedish Speedway Team Championship

Njudungarna changed their name to Vetlanda.

1987

1987 Swedish Individual Speedway Championship (Goteborg, 29 August)

1987 Swedish Speedway Team Championship

1988

1988 Swedish Individual Speedway Championship (Kumla Motorstadion, Kumla, 27 August)

1988 Swedish Speedway Team Championship

Getingarna and Gamarna merged to become became Stockholm United and Tuna Rebels changed their name to Eskilstuna.

1989

1989 Swedish Individual Speedway Championship (Smedstadion, Eskilstuna, 23 September)

1989 Swedish Speedway Team Championship

1990s 

1990

1990 Swedish Individual Speedway Championship (Stockholm, 22 September)

1990 Swedish Speedway Team Championship

Eskilstuna and Karlstad merged for the 1990 season.

1991

1991 Swedish Individual Speedway Championship  (Vetlanda, 21 September)

1991 Swedish Speedway Team Championship

Brassarna changed their name to Nässjö and Örebro changed their name to Buddys.

1992

1992 Swedish Individual Speedway Championship (Mariestad, 6 September)

1992 Swedish Speedway Team Championship

Many of the teams created a reserve side to compete in the lower divisions, they were - Stockholm (Getingarna), Husarerna (Indianerna), Stjärnorna (Rospiggarna), Gesällerna (Smederna), Zaags (Dackarna), Njudungarna (Vetlanda), Peking Riders (Vargarna) and Mariestad (Örnarna).

1993

1993 Swedish Individual Speedway Championship (Linkoping, 5 September)

1993 Swedish Speedway Team Championship

1994

1994 Swedish Individual Speedway Championship (Vastervik, 3 September)

1994 Swedish Speedway Team Championship

Buddys change their name to Team Viking.

1995

1995 Swedish Individual Speedway Championship (Kumla Motorstadion, Kumla, 2 September)

1995 Swedish Speedway Team Championship

Three more teams introduced reserves teams called Wisby (Bysarna), Buddys (Team Viking) and Göteborg (Kaparna).

1996

1996 Swedish Individual Speedway Championship (Orionparken, Hallstavik, 24 August)

1996 Swedish Speedway Team Championship

Leading positions in Division 1 North & South groups determined Division 1A & 1B leagues.

1997

1997 Swedish Individual Speedway Championship (Vetlanda, 16 August)

1997 Swedish Speedway Team Championship

Dackarna changed their name to Team Svelux. Leading positions in Division 1 North & South groups determined Division 1A & 1B leagues.

1998

1998 Swedish Individual Speedway Championship (Hagfors, 16 August)

1998 Swedish Speedway Team Championship

1999

1999 Swedish Individual Speedway Championship (Norrkoping, 4 September)

1999 Swedish Speedway Team Championship

Allsvenskan introduced as the division below the Eliserien.

2000s 

2000

2000 Swedish Individual Speedway Championship (Målilla Motorstadion, Målilla, 19 August)

2000 Swedish Speedway Team Championship

2001

2001 Swedish Individual Speedway Championship  (Avesta, 1 September 2001)

2001 Swedish Speedway Team Championship

Play offs

2002

2002 Swedish Individual Speedway Championship  (Smedstadion, Eskilstuna, 17 August)

2002 Swedish Speedway Team Championship

Team Svelux became Luxo Stars.

Play offs

2003

2003 Swedish Individual Speedway Championship (Hagfors, 2 August)
		

2003 Swedish Speedway Team Championship

Vetlanda became VMS Elit.

Play offs

2004

2004 Swedish Individual Speedway Championship  (Målilla, 3 July)

2004 Swedish Speedway Team Championship

Play offs

2005

2005 Swedish Individual Speedway Championship  (Vetlanda, 2 July)

2005 Swedish Speedway Team Championship

Play offs

2006

2006 Swedish Individual Speedway Championship (Motala, 5 August)

2006 Swedish Speedway Team Championship

Play offs

2007

2007 Swedish Individual Speedway Championship (Kumla Motorstadion, Kumla, 1 September)

2007 Swedish Speedway Team Championship

Play offs

2008

2008 Swedish Individual Speedway Championship (Avesta, 8 August)

2008 Swedish Speedway Team Championship

Play offs

2009

2009 Swedish Individual Speedway Championship (G&B Stadium, Målilla, 25 July)

2009 Swedish Speedway Team Championship

Play offs

2010s 

2010

2010 Swedish Individual Speedway Championship (G&B Stadium, Målilla, 18 September)

2010 Swedish Speedway Team Championship

Play offs

2011

2011 Swedish Individual Speedway Championship (G&B Stadium, Målilla, 17 September)

2011 Swedish Speedway Team Championship

Play offs

2012

2012 Swedish Individual Speedway Championship (Vetlanda, 6 June)

2012 Swedish Speedway Team Championship

Play offs

2013

2013 Swedish Individual Speedway Championship (Vetlanda, 30 August)

2013 Swedish Speedway Team Championship

Play offs

2014

2014 Swedish Individual Speedway Championship (Nykoping, 5 September 2014)

2014 Swedish Speedway Team Championship

Play offs

2015

2015 Swedish Individual Speedway Championship (Parken, Hallstavik, 1 August 2015)

2015 Swedish Speedway Team Championship

Play offs

2016

2016 Swedish Individual Speedway Championship (HZ Bygg Arena, Hallstavik, 23 July)

2016 Swedish Speedway Team Championship

Play offs

2017

2017 Swedish Individual Speedway Championship (Avesta, 1 July)

2017 Swedish Speedway Team Championship

Play offs

2018

2018 Swedish Individual Speedway Championship (Smedstadion, Eskilstuna, 4 August 2018)

2018 Swedish Speedway Team Championship

Play offs

2019

2020s 

2020

2021

2022

2023

See also 
Swedish Speedway Team Championship
Speedway in Sweden

References 

Speedway
Speedway in Sweden